The 1999 NCAA Division I baseball season, play of college baseball in the United States organized by the National Collegiate Athletic Association (NCAA) began in the spring of 1999.  The season progressed through the regular season and concluded with the 1999 College World Series.  The College World Series, held for the fifty third time in 1999, consisted of one team from each of eight super regional competitions and was held in Omaha, Nebraska, at Johnny Rosenblatt Stadium as a double-elimination tournament.  Miami (FL) claimed the championship for the third time.

Realignment
Lamar left the Sun Belt Conference and joined the Southland Conference.

Format changes
The Big West Conference, Mid-Continent Conference, and Pacific-10 Conference dissolved their two division formats.
The Trans America Athletic Conference dissolved its unique three division format.
The West Coast Conference divided into two divisions of four teams each, named West and Coast.
The Northeast Conference added Central Connecticut (formerly of the Mid-Continent Conference), Quinnipiac (formerly NCAA Division II), and UMBC (formerly of the Big South Conference) and created North and South Divisions of five and four teams, respectively.

Conference winners
This is a partial list of conference champions from the 1999 season.  The NCAA sponsored regional and super regional competitions to determine the College World Series participants.  Each of the sixteen regionals consisted of four teams competing in double-elimination tournaments, with the winners advancing to eight best of three Super Regionals.  The winners of each Super Regional advanced to Omaha.  29 teams earned automatic bids by winning their conference championship while 35 teams earned at-large selections.

Conference standings
The following is an incomplete list of conference standings:

College World Series

The 1999 season marked the fifty third NCAA Baseball Tournament, which culminated with the eight team College World Series.  The College World Series was held in Omaha, Nebraska.  The eight teams played a double-elimination format, with Miami (FL) claiming their third championship with a 6–5 win over Florida State in the final.

Bracket

Award winners

All-America team

References